Jon Paul "J.P." Testwuide (born November 5, 1984) is an American former professional ice hockey defenseman.

On August 2, 2011, the Chicago Wolves announced that they had signed Testwuide for the 2011–12 AHL season. On November 7, 2011, the Wolves assigned Testwuide to the Missouri Mavericks, the team's Central Hockey League affiliate. On November 14, 2011, Testwuide was recalled by the Wolves. On December 3, 2011, Testwuide was assigned by the Wolves to the Mavericks for a second time. On December 6, 2011, Testwuide was recalled by the Wolves from the Mavericks again. On March 5, 2012, Testwuide was loaned by the Wolves to the Abbotsford Heat, also of the American Hockey League.

Per remarks made by J.P.'s brother, fellow professional Hockey player Mike Testwuide, which were published in a November 26, 2012 blog post on the website of the newspaper The Saratogian, J.P. had retired from professional Hockey.

On January 25, 2013, Testwuide came out of retirement and signed with the Missouri Mavericks of the Central Hockey League for his third stint with the team.

Career statistics

References

External links

1984 births
Adirondack Phantoms players
American men's ice hockey defensemen
Abbotsford Heat players
Chicago Wolves players
Denver Pioneers men's ice hockey players
Houston Aeros (1994–2013) players
Ice hockey players from Colorado
Living people
Missouri Mavericks players
Waterloo Black Hawks players